Dunaivtsi may refer to the following places in Khmelnytskyi Oblast, Ukraine:

 Dunaivtsi, Kamianets-Podilskyi Raion, a city
 Dunaivtsi (urban-type settlement), Kamianets-Podilskyi Raion
 Dunaivtsi Raion